Anne Bedian or Anne Nahabedian (born March 15, 1972) is an Armenian-Canadian actress. She is known for her roles as Maria on Delta State, Dr. Nazir on The Taking of Deborah Logan and Shara on Curb Your Enthusiasm. Bedian is of Armenian descent and speaks Armenian fluently. She also speaks English, French, German, and Spanish. She is a Meisner-trained actor and has Meisner coaches in Montreal, Toronto, New York and Los Angeles to train with where ever she is staying. She was the youngest member to serve on board HMCS Nipigon in the Royal Canadian Navy and received a medal for serving over 180 days with NATO during her 3-year service in the Forces.

Filmography

External links

References

Living people
Actresses from Montreal
Canadian film actresses
Armenian film actresses
21st-century Armenian actresses
21st-century Canadian actresses
Canadian television actresses
Armenian television actresses
Canadian people of Armenian descent
1972 births
Royal Canadian Navy personnel